Xinjiangtitan is an extinct genus of mamenchisaurid sauropod that lived during the Middle Jurassic of what is now Xinjiang, northwestern China. Its type and only species is Xinjiangtitan shanshanesis, known from a single incomplete skeleton recovered from the Qiketai Formation. The holotype preserves one of the most complete vertebral columns of any sauropod found in Asia, and has the longest complete neck known for any animal.

Discovery

In 2013, before the specimen had been fully excavated, Wu Wen-hao, Zhou Chang-fu, Oliver Wings, Toru Sekiha and Dong Zhiming described it as a new genus and species, Xinjiangtitan shanshanesis. The generic name is derived from Xinjiang, and from titan, giant in Greek mythology. The specific name, shanshanesis, is derived from an alternative name for the county where it was found, Shanshan, named after the ancient Shanshan Kingdom. The specific name is occasionally misspelled as "shanshanensis" or "shashaensis", which are invalid spellings even though the correct form would indeed have been  "shanshanensis" rather than shanshanesis, as the Latin suffix "-ensis" meaning "from", was used to create the name. Continued excavation of the type specimen revealed that the neck and tail were nearly complete.

Fossils
Xinjiangtitan shanshanesis is known from a single specimen, the holotype SSV12001, which consists of a nearly complete vertebral column preserved in articulation, as well as a partial skull, partial pelvis, and most of the left hind limb. The neck, of which all 18 vertebrae are present, is nearly 15 meters long and is the longest complete neck ever discovered of any animal. The vertebral column is overall among the most complete of any sauropod specimen from Asia. The cervical and dorsal vertebrae have been described in detail. The specimen was originally reported as being from the Qigu Formation (Late Jurassic), but it was subsequently considered to be from the Qiketai Formation (Middle Jurassic).

Description

Xinjiangtitan was one of the longest known sauropods, with a long neck measuring at least  in length. Xinjiangtitan was diagnosed based on the following traits: the presence of a ventral keel on the penultimate cervical centrum that forms a small semicircular process under the distal articular facet; both cervical vertebrae are relatively elongated; the sacricostal yoke except the first sacral rib; and an extremely robust femur.

Phylogeny
Among sauropods, a phylogenetic analysis places Xinjiangtitan as the sister taxon of Mamenchisaurus, the only other mamenchisaurid included. Xinjiangtitan shares several derived characters with diplodocids, including prominent ambiens process of pubis, relatively short hind limb and fourth trochanter on the femur that is caudomedially developed.

References

Middle Jurassic dinosaurs of Asia
Fossil taxa described in 2013
Mamenchisaurids
Paleontology in Xinjiang
Taxa named by Dong Zhiming